The boys' halfpipe event at the 2016 Winter Youth  Olympics took place on 14 February at the Hafjell Freepark.

Results
The final was started at 10:50.

References

External links
olympedia.org
 

Snowboarding at the 2016 Winter Youth Olympics